Inazuma Eleven is a 2008 to 2011 Japanese anime television series based on Level-5's video game series of the same name. The animated series was produced by OLM under the direction of Katsuhito Akiyama and consists of 127 episodes. In the final season of Inazuma Eleven the new tournament, Football Frontier International was announced, and Inazuma Japan was formed. They faced off against players from all over the world, and even 'people' from heaven and hell.

The opening theme for episodes 88 to 107 is "GOOD Kita!". And the final opening theme starting from episode 108 is "Bokura no Goal!". Closing theme for episodes 88 to 101, and "Shining Power" is the closing theme for episodes 102 to 112.The final closing theme from episode 113 to the end of the series is "Mata ne... no Kisetsu" and was performed by Inazuma All Stars, consisting of Junko Takeuchi, Yuka Nishigaki, Hiroyuki Yoshino, Hirofumi Nojima, and Mamoru Miyano.

Inazuma Eleven was licensed for an English dub by Arait Multimedia S.A. and all episodes of season 3 were dubbed for an international releases.

Episode list

References

Inazuma Eleven episode lists